Far Cry 6 is a 2021 first-person shooter game developed by Ubisoft Toronto and published by Ubisoft. It is the sixth main installment in the Far Cry series and the successor to 2018's Far Cry 5. The game is set on the fictional Caribbean island of Yara, ruled as a dictatorship by "El Presidente" Antón Castillo (portrayed by Giancarlo Esposito) who is raising his son Diego (Anthony Gonzalez) to follow in his rule. Players take on the role of guerilla fighter Dani Rojas (voiced by either Nisa Gunduz or Sean Rey), attempting to topple Castillo and his regime. Gameplay focuses on combat and exploration; players fight enemy soldiers and dangerous wildlife using a wide array of weapons and gadgets. The game features many elements found in role-playing games, such as a leveling up system and side quests. It also features a cooperative multiplayer mode.

Development of Far Cry 6 began around 2016 and was extensive. The team studied several revolutions of recent history for the game's narrative, primarily the Cuban Revolution of 1953–1959. The game was designed to be 'political', covering themes such as the rise of communism in a nation, the costs of imperialism, and the need for free-and-fair elections, in response to the controversy generated by Far Cry 5. The development team also sought to bring back several elements from earlier Far Cry titles such as a tropical setting and a fully voiced protagonist. The game was first teased by Esposito in July 2020, and officially announced later that month, at the Ubisoft Forward online event.

Far Cry 6 was released worldwide for PlayStation 4, PlayStation 5, Stadia, Windows, Xbox One, Xbox Series X/S, and Amazon Luna on October 7, 2021. It received a generally mixed reception, with critics praising the small improvements brought to the series' gameplay formula, but criticizing its story and lack of innovation. Several releases of downloadable content were subsequently published, including three expansion packs centered around antagonists from past Far Cry games.

Gameplay 

Similar to the previous entries in the series, Far Cry 6 is a first-person shooter game, set in an open world environment navigable on foot or via various land, water, and air vehicles. Players assumes the role of a local rebel named Dani Rojas, a former conscript in the military turned into a guerrilla fighter, whose gender they can select at the start of the game. The world is divided into seven main regions with an array of terrain, ranging from urban areas and dense jungles, to mountain ranges and open oceans. Gameplay focuses on armed and close-quarters combat. Players are able to use a wide array of conventional weapons (such as sidearms, assault rifles, submachine guns, shotguns, light-machine guns, sniper rifles and grenade launchers). Firearms can be customized using materials found throughout the world.

In a new addition to the series, the game features several prototypes of special weaponry, called "Resolver weapons", each offering a certain perk to the player's loadout, for example a silent close-range nailgun or a sling-shot projectile weapon which fires CDs. Another new addition is the "Supremo" backpacks, allowing augmentation of the playstyle by assigning more perks to the player's loadout, such as firing homing missiles or seeing enemies through solid objects. Unlike the previous titles in the series, players are able to holster weapons; as a result, enemy NPCs will not attack the player on sight, unless within restricted areas.

The game introduces a "Rank Level" system which indicates the player's rank and highlights the level of a specific region. As the game progresses and the player explores more of the world, enemy forces will be equipped with more powerful gear and target locations become more heavily fortified. Like previous games in the series, outposts are scattered throughout the world, allowing the player to kill or neutralize the enemy presence to reduce the dominance of forces in a particular area. The game also implements a new notoriety and reputation-style gameplay mechanic. If a high notoriety level is earned, as a result of actions taken against enemy NPCs for example, the player will be hunted by special forces. The notoriety meter can be reduced by fleeing combat and staying hidden for a specific period of time.

The player has the ability to construct and upgrade guerrilla bases called "Camp Facilities", which provide useful resources and in-game bonuses to increase the skillset of the character, specialize perks in hunting animals, unlock fast travel locations throughout Yara, enlist new recruits and manage their equipment, or launch friendly NPC operations. The game's version of Far Cry 5s "Fangs for Hire" companion system returns, called "Amigos", which features recruitable animals with a variety of abilities and perks tasked to assist the player in combat and exploration.

Plot 
Far Cry 6 takes place in 2021 in Yara, a fictional Caribbean island nation inspired by Cuba and ruled by the dictator Antón Castillo (Giancarlo Esposito). A 1967 guerrilla revolution that toppled the presidency of his father led to Yara's isolation from the rest of the world. Since then, the country's economy has approached the brink of collapse. In 2014, Antón is elected president and oversees the creation of Viviro, a new cancer treatment developed from Yara's tobacco, promising it will make the economy stable. Seven years after being elected, Antón announces a draft "lottery" to conscript citizens as farmers in the tobacco fields. Antón has a 13-year-old son, Diego (Anthony Gonzalez), whom he grooms to be his successor.

In the capital Esperanza, as Yara's armed forces round up citizens for the draft, Dani prepares to escape to Miami in the United States via fishing boat, alongside friends Lita Torres and Alejo Ruiz. Alejo is shot and killed after provoking troops in the street, while Dani and Lita flee to the awaiting boat filled with other refugees and escape. However, Antón stops the boat and reveals that Diego was attempting to flee with them. After retrieving Diego, he orders the boat sunk by gunfire. Dani survives the commotion and wakes up with a mortally wounded Lita on an island's beach, far away from Esperanza. As Lita dies, she urges Dani to look for the nearby Clara Garcia, leader of the guerilla movement Libertad. Upon arrival, Clara tells Dani to invite ex-spymaster and weapon maker Juan Cortez back into Libertad, disrupt the production of Viviro tobacco in the island, and clear the blockade trapping the guerrillas in the region. Once Dani fulfills all the tasks, Clara gifts Dani a boat to flee Yara. If Dani does not leave, Clara gives the order to aid anti-Castillo forces throughout Yara's three major regions—Madrugada, Valle de Oro, and El Este—and convince them to help Libertad oust Antón.

In Madrugada, Dani searches for the revered Montero family, who are allied with the region's guerrillas and tobacco workers. They take down General José Castillo—Antón's nephew, commander of Yara's air force, and a slave driver who robbed the Monteros and other local farmers of their lands. Over in Valle de Oro, Dani assists the rap band Máximas Matanzas in airing TV and radio performances to push back against pro-Castillo propaganda spread by María Marquessa, Yara's Minister of Culture and Diego's mother. Upon killing María during a televised interview about Viviro, they encounter Dr. Edgar Reyes, the scientist behind Viviro's conception; it is revealed that he performed cruel experiments on disenfranchised tobacco workers in concentration camps as part of his effort to create the drug. With this in mind, Dani goes to one of his research facilities and kills him. Meanwhile in El Este, a man known as "El Tigre" awaits Dani's arrival on top of a mountain hideout housing the veteran revolutionaries who overthrew Antón's father. While he is willing to help Libertad, the others are not, so Dani shows them photos of poor working conditions in tobacco farms to convince them to join. While attempting this, Dani comes across an anarchist rebel group of university students who are fighting against Yara's naval commander Admiral Benítez. The two groups unite and storm Benítez's fort to kill her, ending her iron-fisted rule on Yara's seas. They then track down Sean McKay, a Canadian business magnate who handles Viviro exports and imports, and either kill him or make a deal with him to finance Libertad. 

After uniting the anti-Castillo forces under Libertad, Dani learns that Antón is holding Clara at his private island's villa, under the pretense of a parley. When Dani confronts him, he and Diego reveal that Antón has been suffering from leukemia for 13 years, and the Viviro treatment stopped working 6 months earlier. Impressed by Dani's feats, and wishing that Diego has a protector for when he dies, Antón demands that Dani become his general in exchange for Clara's life. Juan attempts to assassinate Antón but opts to shoot Diego instead, though Dani knocks him out of the way. In response to the shooting, Antón kills Clara and escapes with Diego to Esperanza. Backed by the anti-Castillo forces, Dani enters Antón's presidential palace alone and confronts him in his office with a gun. Dani promises to protect Diego, but Antón, believing that Diego would instead be tortured as he had been after his father's toppling, shoots him before committing suicide. The resistance forces unite with Dani and witness the Castillo corpses. They unanimously declare Dani the new leader of Yara, but Dani refuses the leadership, turning it over to them. After burying Clara, Dani and Juan wage war against Castillo's surviving loyalists.

An alternate ending occurs if Dani sails away from Yara before confronting Castillo. Dani will be shown 3 months later relaxing on a beach in Miami, with a news broadcast detailing how Castillo has consolidated his hold over Yara by crushing rebel forces and executing Clara.

Development 

Production of Far Cry 6 had been ongoing for four years at the time of its July 2020 announcement, with Ubisoft Toronto the lead studio for the game. Narrative director Navid Khavari said that they started researching revolutions of the past, they came across the idea of the modern guerrilla revolution such as the Cuban Revolution, which gave them numerous ideas of how to drive the player-character into fighting against a repressive government. This also brought back the need to give the player-character, Dani Rojas, a voice, compared to recent Far Cry games in which the protagonist had been silent. Khavari said "it was essential for us to ensure that the protagonist has a personal investment in that revolution". Using Cuba as an influence also established the return to a tropical setting, a feature of the earlier Far Cry games, as well as giving the setting a "timeless" look due to economic blockades that had been imposed on the island, mixing vintage cars with modern weapons. Khavari spent a month in Cuba, speaking to residents there to help develop the setting.

In contrast to the media controversy over Ubisoft distancing its stance that Far Cry 5 was made as a political statement, Khavari said that Far Cry 6 was "political", adding: "A story about a modern revolution must be". While the game's narrative element is based on stories around Cuba, Khavari stated that the game "doesn't want to make a political statement about what's happening in Cuba specifically", and does not attempt to make "a simplified, binary political statement specifically on the current political climate in Cuba". Khavari's family had experienced the Iranian Revolution in the late 1970s, eventually having fled to Canada, and using these experiences, those from Cuba, and from other research that Ubisoft had done, he wanted Far Cry 6 to have a story "about the conditions that lead to the rise of fascism in a nation, the costs of imperialism, forced labor, the need for free-and-fair elections, LGBTQ+ rights, and more."

Word of a new Far Cry game was teased in early July 2020, as actor Giancarlo Esposito has mentioned he had recently taken part in a "huge video game", including voice work and motion capture. Shortly after this, rumored leaks of Far Cry 6s existence appeared, including screens that showed a character resembling Esposito. Ubisoft affirmed the game's existence a few days ahead of the full announcement through social media, and fully revealed the game on July 12, 2020, during their Ubisoft Forward online event.

Additionally, Anthony Gonzalez voices and provides the character model and motion capture for Diego. Esposito and Gonzalez had done the motion-capture and voice work for the game's trailer before shooting any of the footage for the game's narrative, as this gave the developers the time to create the character models for the game itself. For Esposito, he had been interested in the motion capture facets of the role, as he had done some for the canceled Mouse Guard film and was interested in doing more, as well as his interest in the type of character that Ubisoft had created for him.  Khavari said they had provided Esposito background material to help prepare before recording for the game, and upon these sessions, he found that Esposito had "done so much research already based on the material that we sent him. He brings an amazing empathy to his characters, and he brought that same empathy to Antón that I wasn't expecting."

Pedro Bromfman composed the music for the game. The game runs on the Dunia 2 engine, with new features such as ray tracing support on the PC version and support for AMD's open source variable resolution technology, FidelityFX.

Release 
The game was originally scheduled for release on February 18, 2021, on PlayStation 4, PlayStation 5, Stadia, Windows, Xbox One, Xbox Series X/S, and Amazon Luna. On October 29, 2020, Ubisoft announced that the release would be delayed due to impacts from the ongoing COVID-19 pandemic. During Ubisoft's quarterly earnings call in February 2021, the company announced that the game would be released before September 30, 2021. As part of further gameplay reveals on May 28, 2021, Ubisoft also announced the planned release date for Far Cry 6 as October 7, 2021.

As part of the game's season pass, additional content includes story episodes letting the player take on the role of three antagonists from preceding Far Cry titles: Vaas Montenegro (Michael Mando) from Far Cry 3, Pagan Min (Troy Baker) from Far Cry 4, and Joseph Seed (Greg Bryk) from Far Cry 5 and Far Cry New Dawn. In addition, the season pass comes with an updated version of Far Cry 3: Blood Dragon. Additional free content includes a guest appearance by Danny Trejo, a Rambo-inspired mission, and a crossover mission with Stranger Things.

Reception 

Far Cry 6 received "generally favorable" reviews for the Xbox Series X/S versions, but "mixed or average" reviews for the Windows and PlayStation 5 versions, according to review aggregator Metacritic.

An IGN review by Jon Ryan said that "Far Cry 6 smooths over a lot of the bumps that have cropped up in the past few games. Even though it misses some steps, especially with its new inventory system, it's the best the series has been in years." Destructoids Jordan Devore wrote "Solid and definitely have  an audience. There could be some hard-to-ignore faults, but the experience is fun."

Rachel Weber from GamesRadar+ wrote that "Far Cry 6 feels like the turning point for a series in transition. Everything you know and love about it is still there [...] but the small changes that have been made have a big impact on the overall experience", such as the main character being visible in cutscenes. Eurogamer outlined in their review: "There's plenty that's familiar about the latest entry in Ubisoft's open world shooter, but that doesn't stop it being a blast."

Conversely, Polygons Diego Arguello said that Far Cry 6 "is a waste of potential", criticizing its Latin American stereotypes and feeling it fumbled any attempt at saying something meaningful despite the game's overt political theme, citing an instance "in which you rescue refugees by using a weapon that plays Macarena while you're aiming down its sights". Writing for Vice, Matthew Gault criticized and described the game as "creatively and morally bankrupt", noting his article "isn't a review" because he could not continue playing it. Screen Rants Alex Santa Maria and Kotakus Zack Zwiezen both criticized Far Cry 6 for being too similar to its predecessors.

Sales

The PlayStation 4 version of Far Cry 6 was the second bestselling retail game during its first week of release in Japan, with 34,219 physical copies being sold. The Playstation 5 version sold 16,686 physical copies in Japan throughout the same week, making it the third bestselling retail game in the country.

Awards and accolades

Notes

References

External links 
 

2021 video games
Biological weapons in popular culture
Far Cry video games
Dystopian video games
Filicide in fiction
First-person shooters
Multiplayer and single-player video games
Open-world video games
PlayStation 4 games
PlayStation 5 games
Fiction about rebellions
Stadia games
Ubisoft games
Video game sequels
Video games developed in Canada
Video games featuring protagonists of selectable gender
Video games postponed due to the COVID-19 pandemic
Video games set in a fictional country
Video games set in the Caribbean
Video games set on fictional islands
Windows games
Xbox One games
Xbox Series X and Series S games